Iervolino or Jervolino is an Italian surname. Notable people with the surname include:

Andrea Iervolino (born 1987), Italian-Canadian film producer, entrepreneur and businessman
Angelo Raffaele Jervolino (1890–1985), Italian politician
Rosa Russo Iervolino (born 1936), Italian politician
Walther Jervolino (1944–2012), Italian painter and artist.